is a 2017 Japanese mystery film based on the novel Hyouka by Honobu Yonezawa. It stars Kento Yamazaki and Alice Hirose, and it is directed by Mari Asato. It was released on November 3, 2017 and distributed by Kadokawa Pictures.

Plot 
Hotarou Oreki (Kento Yamazaki) is a freshman at Kamiyama high school. He's lazy and his motto is, "If I don’t have to do it, I won’t. If I have to do it, I’ll make it quick". He does not want to participate in any club activities at his school but he joins the Classic Literature club when his older sister tells him she had been a member and it is about to die off because of disinterest in it. She asks him to join and he is unable to refuse things she asks of him. There, he meets Eru Chitanda (Alice Hirose), an innocent girl with great curiosity from one of the most prominent families in that town. Two of Hotarou's friends, Satoshi Fukube (Amane Okayama) and Mayaka Ibara (Fujiko Kojima), also become members of the club. They solve various mysteries in their school including the most important one. Eru's uncle, Jun Sekiya (Kanata Hongo), had been a member of the club and a Hyouka anthology which was published 33 years ago relates to his disappearance 10 years earlier. Eru asks Hotarou to find out what her uncle said to her when she was a child that made her cry. The four of them begin trying to reveal what really happened to Eru's uncle, which ends up being related to the Hyouka anthology and their school festival.

Cast
 Kento Yamazaki as Hotarou Oreki
 Alice Hirose as Eru Chitanda 
 Amane Okayama as Satoshi Fukube
 Fujiko Kojima as Mayaka Ibara
 Kanata Hongo as Jun Sekiya
 Yuki Saito as Yoko Itoigawa

References

External links
 

Films based on Japanese novels
Japanese mystery films
2010s Japanese films